Charles de Montmorency, Duke of Damville (1537-1612) was a French nobleman, Baron, later Duke of Damville, Admiral of France.

He was the third son of Anne de Montmorency, Duke of Montmorency and Marshal of France, and Madeleine, the daughter of René of Savoy. Originally his title was Seigneur de Méru, and in 1579, after his older brother died, Charles became Baron of Damville.

From the youngest age he participated in the wars which France led almost continuously at the time. In 1557, he, together with his father, was taken prisoner after the Battle of St. Quentin. In 1562 in the course of the French Wars of Religion he participated in the Battle of Dreux, where his father headed the Catholic army against the Huguenots. In 1563, king Charles IX made him the lieutenant general of Paris and Ile-de-France. Further, Charles de Montmorency participated in the Battle of Saint-Denis in 1567 and subsequently was named the colonel general of the Swiss. In 1569, he participated in the Battle of Moncontour, and in 1572—1573, in the siege of La Rochelle. In 1574, however, Charles de Montmorency got out of favor and had to retire to the countryside.

In 1588 he returned to Paris, and in 1589, participated in the Battle of Arques on the side of Henry IV of France who won the battle. In 1592, he fought in the Battle of Craon, and in 1596 was appointed Admiral of France.

References

1537 births
1612 deaths
Admirals of France
Damville